Drag chain may refer to:

 Cable carrier in moving machinery
 Drag conveyor, for moving bulk material
 A type of chain shift in linguistics
 Part of a dragline excavator
 Chain used to slow a ship during a ship launching